Bagli (बागली) Assembly constituency, also spelled Bagali, is one of the seats in Madhya Pradesh Legislative Assembly in India. It is a segment of Khandwa Lok Sabha constituency.

Members of Legislative Assembly

As a part of Madhya Bharat
 1952: Mishrilal Gangwal, Indian National Congress

As a part of Madhya Pradesh
 1962: Kailash Chandra Joshi, Bharatiya Jan Sangh
 1967: Kailash Chandra Joshi, Bharatiya Jan Sangh
 1972: Kailash Chandra Joshi, Bharatiya Jan Sangh
 1977: Kailash Chandra Joshi, Janata Party
 1980: Kailash Chandra Joshi, Bharatiya Janata Party
 1985: Kailash Chandra Joshi, Bharatiya Janata Party
 1990: Kailash Chandra Joshi, Bharatiya Janata Party
 1993: Kailash Chandra Joshi, Bharatiya Janata Party
 1998: Shyam Holani (Congress)
 2003: Deepak Joshi, Bharatiya Janata Party. (Son of Kailash Joshi) 
 2008: Champalal Devda, Bharatiya Janata Party
 2013: Champalal Devda, Bharatiya Janata Party

Election results

2018

2013

See also

 Dewas district
 Bagli, Dewas
 Khandwa (Lok Sabha constituency)

References

Assembly constituencies of Madhya Pradesh
Dewas district